Rob Crosby (born Robert Crosby Hoar; April 25, 1954) is an American country music artist. Between 1990 and 1996, Rob charted eight singles on the U.S. Billboard Hot Country Singles & Tracks charts. He has also recorded six studio albums, with his most recent, Catfish Day, being released in 2007. He also co-wrote Eric Paslay's 2014 single "Friday Night", The Common Linnets' 2014 single "Calm After the Storm", Martina McBride's 2003 single "Concrete Angel", Andy Griggs' 2000 single "She's More" and Lee Greenwood's 1990 single "Holdin' a Good Hand" and has written songs for Luke Combs, Lady Antebellum, Carl Perkins, Paul Simon, Brooks & Dunn, Restless Heart, Blackhawk, Darryl Worley, Boy Howdy, Ty Herndon, Don Williams, Ilse DeLange, Trace Adkins, Lee Brice and more.

Biography

Early life
Rob Crosby was born and raised in Sumter, South Carolina, graduating in the Sumter High School class of 1972. He wrote his first song when he was 9 years old, and by the time he started the fifth grade, he had his own band, The Radiations. During High School and college, he performed in South Carolina, and eventually across the Southeast. In 1984, Crosby moved to Nashville with his family and began playing in local clubs.

Songwriter
In 1984, an Atlanta businessman offered Crosby $700 a month for a cut in his future songwriting royalties. After getting a job as a staff writer, country music group Chance took his song "She Told Me Yes" to the top 30 in 1985. Since then, many songs written by Crosby have reached the Billboard top 10, including "Friday Night" by Eric Paslay, "Concrete Angel" by Martina McBride, "She's More" by Andy Griggs and "Holdin' a Good Hand" by Lee Greenwood. Crosby's songs have been recorded by Blackhawk, Brooks & Dunn, Ty Herndon, Paul Overstreet, Carl Perkins, Restless Heart, Ricochet, Paul Simon, The Wilkinsons and Darryl Worley, among others.

Music career
In the 1970's and 80's, Rob recorded music for independent labels: Guru Records and Southern Tracks Records. After a performance at a songwriter's night, Crosby was signed to Arista Nashville. The label released his debut album, Solid Ground, in 1991. The first three singles, "Love Will Bring Her Around," "She's a Natural" and "Still Burnin' for You," all reached the top 20 on Billboard'''s Hot Country Songs chart. But after two commercially unsuccessful albums, Crosby was dropped from Arista in 1993.  In 1995, he signed with River North and released his third album, Starting Now. Both singles released from the project peaked outside of the top 60 on Billboard. The same year, he was offered a chance to join the country music band Burnin' Daylight (which featured former members of Southern Pacific and Exile); however, he decided to focus on his solo career instead.

Crosby returned in 2003 on CSC Records with One Light in the Dark, a collection of original songs. He has released two albums since, 2003's Time Is a Gypsy and 2007's Catfish Day.''

Discography

Albums

Singles

Music videos

Chart Singles written by Rob Crosby

The following is a list of Rob Crosby compositions that were chart hits.

References

External links
Official website
 

American country singer-songwriters
American male singer-songwriters
Living people
1954 births
Arista Nashville artists
Eurovision Song Contest entrants of 2014
Eurovision Song Contest entrants for the Netherlands